Lanark—Frontenac—Lennox and Addington was a federal electoral district in Ontario, Canada which was represented in the House of Commons of Canada between 2004 and 2015. It was abolished for the 2015 general election; the Lanark County and Frontenac components of the riding were redistributed to the new district of Lanark—Frontenac—Kingston, while Lennox and Addington County was redistributed to the new district of Hastings—Lennox and Addington.

The riding was created in 2003 from parts of Hastings—Frontenac—Lennox and Addington and Lanark—Carleton, and was first contested in the 2004 federal election. Conservative candidate Scott Reid, the incumbent MP for Lanark-Carleton and Liberal candidate Larry McCormick, incumbent MP for Hastings—Frontenac—Lennox and Addington, both ran for the seat.  Bill Vankoughnet, a former Progressive Conservative MP who had represented Hastings—Frontenac—Lennox and Addington prior to 1993, also ran for the seat.  Reid was elected by a margin of over 10,000 votes, and was re-elected by gradually increasing margins in 2006, 2008, and 2011. By the final election held in the riding, Reid's margin of victory had grown to 20,000 votes.

The riding's conservative voting pattern was in line with rural ridings immediately to the west of the city of Ottawa; in four federal elections, Reid never dipped below 27,000 votes, while no challenger rose above 18,000 votes. He was the only MP ever elected in Lanark—Frontenac—Lennox and Addington.

Members of Parliament

Election results

See also
 List of Canadian federal electoral districts
 Past Canadian electoral districts

References

Citations

Sources 

 
 Parliament of Canada constituency profile
 Elections Canada election results since 2004
2011 Results from Elections Canada

External links
 Constituency website of MP Scott Reid

Former federal electoral districts of Ontario
Carleton Place